Elishama is a moshav in central Israel. Located in the Sharon plain near Hod HaSharon and Kfar Saba, it falls under the jurisdiction of Drom HaSharon Regional Council.

History
The moshav was founded in 1950 by Jewish refugees from Tripoli (in modern Libya) on land that had belonged to the depopulated Palestinian Arab village of Biyar 'Adas. It was named after the Biblical character Elishama ben Ammihud, a leader of the Tribe of Ephraim (Numbers 10:22).

References 

Moshavim
Populated places established in 1950
Populated places in Central District (Israel)
1950 establishments in Israel
Libyan-Jewish culture in Israel